"I Like It" is the debut single from American R&B singer Sammie. Written by producer Dallas Austin for his debut studio album, From the Bottom to the Top (2000), the song was released as the album's lead single in late 1999 and certified gold by the RIAA. It peaked at number 8 on the Billboard Hot R&B Singles chart and number 24 on the Billboard Hot 100. Sammie was only twelve years old when he recorded the song, which is regarded as his signature song.

Music video
The video was released in March 1999. It starts out with Sammie singing inside a locker and then hanging out with friends singing on the school front steps. It then features a dance scene inside Sammie's locker and him playing basketball. Afterwards, it shows a load of girls running as in red light, green light as when Sammie turns around. The video ends with Sammie face-to-face with the girl he was singing about. It features then R&B teen-group "N-Toon" which featured singer Lloyd.

Format and track listings

CD single 
"I Like It" - 4:11
"I Like It" (Instrumental) - 4:11
"The Bottom" - 3:03
"The Bottom" (Instrumental) - 3:03

CD maxi-single 
"I Like It" - 4:11
"I Like It" (Remix) - 4:09
"I Like It" (Remix Instrumental) - 4:09
"The Bottom" - 3:03
Snippets of... "Can't Let Go/Crazy Things I Do/Stuff Like This/Hero" - 5:51

Personnel
Credits for "I Like It" major single releases adapted from AllMusic.

 Dallas Austin – composer, executive producer, producer
 Leslie Brathwaite – mixing
 Sammie Bush – featured artist, primary artist, vocals
 David Gates – A&R direction
 Brian Gardener – mastering
 Ty Hudson – assistant engineer, mixing assistant
 Joyce Irby – co-executive producer
 Mark Goodchild – engineer, mixing assistant
 JT Money – featured artist, vocals, composer
 Debra Killings – background vocals

 Daniel Kresco- mixing assistant
 Andrew Lyn – assistant engineer, engineer
 Carlton Lynn - engineer
 Jason Piske – mixing assistant
 Rick Sheppard – midi & sound design
 Kimberly Smith – A&R coordinator
 Vega – background vocals
 Gary White – composer
 Colin Wolfe – composer, producer

Charts and certifications

Weekly charts

Year-end charts

Certifications

|}

References

External links
 Princesammie.com — official Sammie site
 Sammie music videos — watch "I Like It" at YouTube

1999 songs
1999 debut singles
Sammie songs
Songs written by Dallas Austin
Capitol Records singles